Maiden's Green or Maidens Green is a small village in Berkshire, England, in the civil parish of Winkfield.

Geography
Maiden's Green has a site of Special Scientific Interest (SSSI) just to the north of the village, called Chawridge Bourne, which includes a nature reserve called Chawridge Bank.

Notable buildings
Just north of the village, on the Drift Road, stands New Lodge, built in 1857 for Sylvain Van de Weyer, the Belgian ambassador to the United Kingdom.

References

Villages in Berkshire
Winkfield